Viktor Grigorievich Ilichyov (5 February 1946 —  8 October 2010) was a Soviet actor. He appeared in more than seventy films from 1967 to 2006. He lived in the United States of America beginning in 1992.

Selected filmography
Viktor Ilichyov entered the twenty most filmed actors of the USSR, having played in 100 films until 1991.

References

External links 

1946 births
2010 deaths
Soviet male film actors
Russian male film actors
Deaths from cancer in Florida
Russian State Institute of Performing Arts alumni
Russian emigrants to the United States
Deaths from bladder cancer
Honored Artists of the RSFSR
Male  actors  from Saint Petersburg